{|

{{Infobox ship characteristics
|Hide header=
|Header caption=
|Ship class=*Fishing trawler (1926–41)
Vorpostenboot (1941–44)
|Ship type=
|Ship tonnage=, 
|Ship displacement=
|Ship length=
|Ship beam=
|Ship height=
|Ship draught=
|Ship depth=
|Ship decks=
|Ship deck clearance=
|Ship ramps=
|Ship ice class=
|Ship sail plan=
|Ship power=Compound steam engine, 57nhp
|Ship propulsion=Single screw propeller
|Ship speed=
|Ship capacity=
|Ship crew=
|Ship notes=
}}
|}Claus Bolten was a German fishing trawler which was requistioned by the Kriegsmarine in the Second World War for use as a vorpostenboot, serving as V 213 Claus Bolten. She was sunk in a battle in the English Channel in July 1944.

Description
The engine was made by Christiansen & Mayer, Harburg. It was rated at 57nhp. The engine powered a single screw propeller.

HistoryClaus Bolten was built as yard number 219 by Schiffbau-Gesellschaft Unterweser m.b.H, Wesermünde, Germany. She was launched on 25 September 1937 and completed on 17 December. She was built for the Cuxhavener Hochseefischerei, Cuxhaven. The Code Letters RGCK were allocated, as was the fishing boat registration HC 186. On 8 March 1929, she was sold to the Deutsche Hochsee Fischerei Bremen-Cuxhaven AG. On 22 January 1932, she was on of seven trawlers that put in to Reyjkjavík, Iceland having been damaged by severe weather. Claus Bolten had her funnel carried away. In 1934, her Code Letters were changed to DHED.

On 18 June 1940, Claus Bolten was requisitoned by the Kriegsmarine for use as a vorpostenboot. She was allocated to 2 Vorpostenflottille as V 213 Claus Bolten''. V 209 ''Carl Röver was severely damaged and the minesweeper  was sunk in the engagement.

References

Sources

1926 ships
Ships built in Bremen (state)
Fishing vessels of Germany
Steamships of Germany
World War II merchant ships of Germany
Auxiliary ships of the Kriegsmarine
Maritime incidents in June 1944
World War II shipwrecks in the English Channel